The Norinco JW-20 is a semi-automatic rifle produced by Norinco based on the Browning 22 Semi-Auto rifle.

References

.22 LR semi-automatic rifles
Norinco